Deparja railway station 
();) is located in Mirwah tehsil of Khairpur district, Sindh Pakistan.Deeparja is a village at Deeparja railway station. If going from Karachi to Lahore (South to North) this railway station comes before Setharja railway station.

Nearest places
Setharja
Thari Mirwah
Hingorja

See also
 List of railway stations in Pakistan
 Pakistan Railways

References

External links

Railway stations in Khairpur District
Thari Mirwah